Warren is a common English and Irish surname and a masculine given name derived from the Norman family "de Warenne" (see De Warenne family), a reference to a place called Varenne, a hamlet near Arques-la-Bataille, along the river Varenne (Warinna in Medieval documents) in Normandy. The river name is thought to be derived from the continental Old Celtic Var- / Ver-  "water, river", with a Germanic influence on the initial V- > W- after Warinna, from the Proto-Germanic war-, meaning "to protect or defend".

Notable people with the name "Warren" include:

Surname

A–D
 Alan Warren (sailor) (born 1935), British sailor
 Alan Warren (priest) (1932–2020), Anglican priest and author
 Alfred Warren (1856–1927), British Conservative member of Parliament
 Allan Warren, English photographer
 Andy Warren (British musician)
 Andy Warren (Canadian musician)
 Andrew Warren (disambiguation), several people
 Arnold Warren, English athlete
 Art Warren (born 1993), American baseball player
 Austin Warren (disambiguation), several people
 Barney E. Warren (18671951), American Christian hymnwriter and minister
 Ben Warren (1879–1917), English footballer
 C. Denier Warren, American-born actor
 Caroline Matilda Warren, American educator, novelist and children's writer
 Charles Warren, British general and Commissioner of Police of the Metropolis in London
 Charles Marquis Warren, American film producer, writer and director
 Chris Warren III (born 1996), American football player
 Clem Warren, (1899–1956), English footballer
 Curtis Warren (born 1963), British criminal
 Dale Warren, American musician and arranger
 Darren Warren, American country music singer
 David Warren (disambiguation), several people
 Des Warren, British trade unionist
 Diane Warren, American songwriter
 Dianne Warren, Canadian author
 Don Warren, American football player

E–K
 Earl Warren (1891–1974), Chief Justice of the United States
 Earl W. Warren (1902–1972), American politician
 Earle Warren (1914–1994), American musician
 Ed Warren, American demonologist and paranormal investigator
 Edward Warren (disambiguation), several people
 Eleanor Warren (1919–2005), British cellist and music producer  
 Elizabeth Warren (born 1949), U.S. senator from Massachusetts and former law professor
 Emily Warren (disambiguation), several people
 Estella Warren, Canadian actress
 Fiske Warren, American businessman
 Fran Warren (1926–2013), American popular music singer
 Francis E. Warren (1844–1929), American politician; first governor of Wyoming
 Frank Warren (disambiguation), several people
 Fred Warren, Welsh international football player
 Frederick Warren (1775–1848), Royal Navy officer
 Fuller Warren, governor of Florida
 George T. Warren, American politician
 Gouverneur K. Warren, Union general in the American Civil War
 Guy Warren (1923–2008), Ghanaian musician
 Harriet Merrick Warren (1843–1893), American editor
 Harry Warren, American songwriter
 Henry E. Warren (1872–1957), American inventor
 Henry White Warren (1831–1912), American bishop
 James Warren (disambiguation), several people
 Jaylen Warren (born 1998), American football player
 Jim Warren (disambiguation), several people
 John Warren (disambiguation), several people
 Sir John Borlase Warren, 1st Baronet, English admiral, politician and diplomat
 Joseph Warren (disambiguation), several people
 Josiah Warren, American inventor, musician, and anarchist author
 Kenneth Warren (disambiguation), several people

L–Z
 Lella Warren (1899-1982), American novelist and short story writer
 Leonard Warren, American baritone
 Lesley Ann Warren, American actress and singer
 Lillie Eginton Warren (1858–1910), American educator, author, inventor
 Linda Warren, American author
 Marc Warren (disambiguation), several people
 Marcia Warren (born 1943), English stage, film and television actress
 Mary Evalin Warren (1829–1904), American author, lecturer, social reformer
 Matthew Warren (1642–1706), English minister
 Mercy Otis Warren (1728–1814), American writer
 Michael Warren II (born 1998), American football player
 Michael Warren (actor) (born 1946), American actor and basketball player
 Minton Warren (1850–1907), American classical scholar
 Moses Warren (1779–1845), New York politician
 Nancy Warren (baseball), All-American Girls Professional Baseball League pitcher
 Pierre Warren, American football player
 Ray Warren, Australian sports commentator
 Ray Warren (footballer), English football player
 Raymond Warren (disambiguation), several people
 Rebecca Warren (born 1965), British visual artist and sculptor
 Richard Warren (disambiguation), several people
 Rick Warren, Christian author and pastor
 Robert Penn Warren, American Poet
 Rosa Warrens (1821–1878), Swedish poet and translator
 Rusty Warren (1955-2021), American comedian and singer
 Samuel Warren (disambiguation), several people
 T. J. Warren (born 1993), American basketball player
 T. Raymond Warren, North Carolina politician
 Thomas Warren (disambiguation), several people
 Tommy Warren, Major League Baseball pitcher
 Tish Harrison Warren (born 1979), American author and Anglican priest
 Tony Warren (1936–2016), English scriptwriter, originator of Coronation Street
 Ty Warren, defensive tackle for the New England Patriots
 Vince Warren, American football player
 W. Rice Warren (1885–1969), American sports coach and physician
 William Warren (disambiguation), several people
 Willie D. Warren (1924–2000), American electric blues guitarist, bass player and singer

Given name

Warren Adelson (born 1942), American art dealer and art historian
Warren Allmand (1932–2016), Canadian politician and human rights activist
Warren Barton (born 1969), English footballer
Warren Beatty (born 1937), American actor
Warren Wallace Beckwith (1874–1955), Lincoln family member
Warren Berlinger (1937–2020), American actor
Warren Eugene Brandon (1916–1977), California painter and photographer
Warren Brown, English actor
Warren Buffett, American investor, businessman, and philanthropist
Warren E. Burger (1907–1995), Chief Justice of the United States
Warren Christopher (1925–2011), U.S. Secretary of State
Warren Clarke (1947–2014), English actor
Warren Cromartie (born 1953), American baseball player
Warren Cuccurullo (born 1956), musician
Warren DeMartini (born 1963), musician
Warren Ellis (born 1968), comic book writer, novelist, and screenwriter
Warren Ellis, musician
Warren Ewens, Australian biologist and statistician
Warren Farrell (born 1943), American educator, activist, and author on gender issues
Warren Feeney, Northern Ireland international footballer
Warren Foegele, Canadian ice hockey player
Warren Furman, former UK Gladiator
Warren Fury, Wales international rugby union player
Warren G (born 1970), American rapper
Warren Gatland (born 1963), New Zealand rugby union coach
Warren C. Gill (1912–1987), American Coast Guardsman and politician
Warren G. Harding (1865–1923), President of the United States
Warren Hastings (1732–1818), first Governor-General of India
Warren Haynes (born 1960), American rock and blues guitarist
Warren Hull (1903–1974), actor and television personality
Warren Joyce (born 1965), English football manager
Warren Macdonald (born 1965), handicapped mountain climber
Warren McClendon (born 2001), American football player
Warren Miller (disambiguation), several people
Warren Mitchell (1926–2015), English actor
Warren Moon (born 1956), American-Canadian football player
Warren "Pete" Moore (1938–2017), singer for The Miracles
Warren Rodwell, Australian former soldier, academic, hostage survivor, and songwriter
Warren Sapp, American football player
Warren Spahn (1921–2003), American baseball player
Warren Spector, game designer
Warren Stevens (1919–2012), American stage, screen, and television actor
Warren Terhune (1869–1920), 13th Governor of American Samoa
Warren T. Thayer (1869–1956), American politician
Warren Wilhelm Jr., birth name of Bill De Blasio, American politician
Warren William (1894-1948), American actor
Warren Zevon (1947–2003), American musician

English version of "Guarinus"
Guarinus of Sitten (1065–1150), Bishop of Sion and saint
Guarinus of Palestrina (died 1158), Bishop of Palestrina and saint

References

English masculine given names
English given names
Masculine given names
English-language surnames